The Nokia Cityman 100 is a 'brick' mobile phone which is discontinued.

References 

Cityman 100
Mobile phones introduced in 1990